Marcos Xavier Andrade (born 3 April 1974), commonly known as Marquinhos Xavier, is a Brazilian futsal coach. He is a coach of Brazil national futsal team.

External links
https://www.playmakerstats.com/coach.php?id=18304
http://www.futsalplanet.com/news.aspx?id=587

1974 births
Living people
Futsal coaches